Ahmed Kabir Kishore (born 1974) is a Bangladeshi cartoonist. He was accused of drawing cartoons and held in pre-trial detention in Bangladesh under the country's infamous Digital Security Act for 10 months since May 2, 2020. Cartoonists Rights Network International, Cartooning for Peace, various international organizations and common people of Bangladesh raised concerns over the detention and custodial torture on Kishore.

Biography 
Kishore's parents are AKM Mozammel Huq and Begum Kohinoor Huq.Mozammel Huque was a deputy general manager of Bangladesh Jute Mills Corporation, an artist, actor, voice artist and a writer as well. He incepted a new cultural activity just after independence war through publishing literature magazines. Kishore learnt how to draw from his father and brother. He passed SSC and HSC examination from Khalishpur Crescent School and BL College respectively. He got admitted in the Architecture department of BUET, but didn't complete his studies. Then he also joined the Bangladesh Navy as an officer cadet, promoted to midshipman and withdrawn from academy for protesting corporal punishment four days before passing out parade. He achieved the most prestigious 'Captains cake' for his unerring performance in arts and crafts competition in the academy. He completed his BSc from Naval Academy. Kishore completed his MDP course from IBA, DU and was later admitted in governance studies (15-16) session under political science, Dhaka University and completed up to the third semester.

Cartoons and activism
Kishore worked for the humor periodicals "Khobor Ache" of Daily Manobjomin, "Alpin" of Prothom Alo, "Bhimrul" of Amar Desh and "Bicchu" of Daily Jugantor. His first job as a cartoonist was in the noted Bangladeshi weekly Bichitra.Then he joined in the daily Prothom Alo as a contributing cartoonist and later joined the Daily Amar Desh as an editorial cartoonist.

Kishore is identified as a Cartoonist Rights Network International (CRNI) "affiliate leader" in Bangladesh for his decade-long work as a cartoonist and activist. He campaigned for jailed Bangladeshi cartoonist Arifur Rahman (2007) and the disappeared Sri Lankan cartoonist Prageeth Eknaligoda (2010). He worked for human rights, Third gender people, health and consumer rights and the Bengali language. During March and April 2020, Kishore drew several cartoons criticizing and satirizing the Bangladesh Government's handling of COVID-19 pandemic and posted it in his Facebook timeline with the title "Life in the Time of Corona". In 2020, he also drew a satirical cartoon mocking the chairman of a private bank, a powerful businessman with close ties to the government of Bangladesh.

Detention and torture
Kishore and his elder friend writer Mushtaq Ahmed were arrested in May, 2020 in Dhaka under the Digital Security Act by Rapid Action Battalion (RAB) unit-3. Kishore, along with 10 others has been accused of "spreading rumours about Father of the Nation Bangabandhu Sheikh Mujibur Rahman, the War of Independence of Bangladesh and the coronavirus pandemic, and using slander, confusion and discord in order to create chaos" under section 21/25 (1) (kha) 31/35 of the Digital Security Act of 2018. The law enforcement agency claims they were detained on May 5 from Kakrail but Kishore alleged that he was picked up by 16-17 police in plainclothes on May 2, 2020, from his Shantinagar residence. Kishore asked and one of the plainclothes police's introduced him as Jasim. Mushtaq was detained for criticizing the Bangladesh government's handling of the coronavirus pandemic. In total eleven people including Kishore and Mustaq were charged with "spreading rumours and carrying out anti-government activities". Among other accused were Didarul Islam Bhuiyan, an activist of a platform called 'Rastrachinta' and Swedish-Bangladeshi journalist Tasneem Khalil, editor of Netra News. According to police complaints, Kishore and other journalists are alleged to tarnish the image of the country by running a popular Facebook page "I am Bangladeshi". Police complaint also mentioned cartoons Kishore's personal Facebook page, "Life in the Time of Corona."

In March 2021, Kishore and his lawyer told the court and the journalists that Kishore had been tortured in custody. Kishore alleged that he was questioned for 69 hours from May 2 to May 5. He was beaten with steel stick. His ear's drum burst when RAB persons slammed his head. He was denied food and insulin even after informing that he was diabetic. Kishore showed the oozing ear canal and scars on his leg to the journalists of The Daily Star (Bangladesh) and Prothom Alo. According to Kishore's brother Ahmed Kabir, Kishore suffered from trauma and major ear damage from the torture in custody. Kishore needed surgery on his ear, eye and had to receive treatment for nose, throat and leg after getting out on bail. Ashique Billah, legal and media wing director of RAB denied any allegations of torture on Kishore, mentioning that "Kishore was speaking as an aggrieved person", which statement he could not make as a law enforcement staff.

Reaction of detention 
Human Rights Watch, PEN America, UN High Commissioner for Human Rights and 13 OECD countries condemned the arrest, and torture of Kishore and Mushtaq. They also urged the Government of Bangladesh to release Kishore. Nine international organizations: AFAD, FORUM-ASIA, AHRC, ANFREL, CIVICUS, Eleos Justice - Monash University, FIDH, OMCT and Robert F Kennedy Human Rights in a joint statement called for investigations of the allegation of torture on Kishore.

Bail
Kishore and Mushtaq were denied bail 6 times by the lower court of Bangladesh during the 10 months period they were detained under the Digital Security Act. Mushtaq died inside Kashimpur High Security Prison on February 25, 2021, at the age of 53. After the death of Ahmed, people of Bangladesh protested in the streets of Dhaka. A panel of high court judges granted Kishore bail on March 3, 2021. Kishore got out of the prison on March 5, 2021, and told the journalists in detail how he was tortured by Rapid Action Battalion.  Editors' council of Bangladesh in a joint statement asked for dropping all the charges against Kishore. On March 10, 2021, Kishore filed a complaint with a Dhaka court recounting his experiences of torture.

Books 
 Bhalobashar Chhoragolpo, Jagriti Publications, 2006
 Kishore er Nirbachito Chushil Cartoon, Amar Prokashoni, 2012
 Bangladesher Cartoon, Cartooner Bangladesh, Shrabon Prokashoni, 2012 - which is the only publication ever on such topic.
 Deyaler Golpo, Priomukh Prokashoni, 2016 - a compilation of short stories.

Awards 
In 2020, Kishore received the Robert Russell Courage in Cartooning Award as a recognition of his "social engagement and defence of human rights". Kishore also received the first Unmad medal from Unmad, a sole cartoon magazine published from Dhaka, Bangladesh.

See also 
 Human rights in Bangladesh

References 

Bangladeshi cartoonists
Bangladeshi prisoners and detainees
Living people
Human rights abuses in Bangladesh
Censorship in Bangladesh
Bangladesh University of Engineering and Technology alumni
1979 births